Anzah or 'Anza is a Palestinian village in the located 18 km southwest of the city of Jenin in the northern West Bank. Its total land area consists of 4,740 dunams of which nearly a 1/4 is covered with olive orchards.  According to the Palestinian Central Bureau of Statistics, the town had a population of 2,006 inhabitants in mid-year 2006.

History 
Pottery sherds from the Byzantine, early Muslim and the Medieval eras have been found here.

Ottoman  era
In 1830, during the Ottoman era, when the forces of Bashir Shihab II besieged Sanur, they were harassed by the people of Anzah. In 1838, 'Anaza was noted as being in the District of esh-Sha'rawiyeh esh-Shurkiyeh, the eastern part.

In 1870, Victor Guérin found it "situated on a hill and  counting scarcely a hundred inhabitants today. A belt of olive trees  surrounds it."

In 1882, the PEF's  Survey of Western Palestine described it as: "A village of ancient appearance on a hill perched above the plain, the houses descending the slope on the south-east. It has two  wells down the hill and a good olive grove near the road on the south. The houses are of stone."

British Mandate era
In the 1922 census of Palestine, conducted by the British Mandate authorities, the village had a population of 537 Muslims, increasing slightly in the 1931 census to 642 Muslims, with 137 houses.

In the 1944/5 statistics, the population was 880  Muslims, with a total of 4,740 dunams of land, according to an official land and population survey. Of this, 958 dunams were used for  plantations and irrigable land, 2,110  dunams for cereals, while 16 dunams were built-up (urban) land.

Jordanian era
In the wake of the 1948 Arab–Israeli War, and after the 1949 Armistice Agreements, Anzah came under  Jordanian rule.

In 1961, the population of 'Anze was  1,011.

Post-1967
Since the Six-Day War in 1967, Anzah  has been held under Israeli occupation. According to the Israeli census of that year, the population of Anza stood at 807, of whom 13 were registered as having come from Israel.

The village has six major families: Obaid, Sadaqa, Barahmeh, Ataya, Khader, and Omour.

See also 
List of cities in Palestinian Authority areas

Footnotes

Bibliography

External links
 Welcome To 'Anza
facebook
Anza, Welcome to Palestine
Survey of Western Palestine, Map 11: IAA, Wikimedia commons 

Villages in the West Bank
Jenin Governorate
Municipalities of the State of Palestine